Bruce Dodson (born 12 May 1949) is a former Australian rules footballer who played with Essendon in the Victorian Football League (VFL). He later returned to Leeor, where he had been recruited from, as captain-coach and also spent two season captain-coaching Nhill.

Notes

External links 
		

Essendon Football Club past player profile

Living people
1949 births
Australian rules footballers from Victoria (Australia)
Essendon Football Club players
Nhill Football Club players